was a Japanese samurai, Shinto priest, and adherent of kokugaku. His courtesy name was initially , but he deferentially changed it to  after realizing the original characters were present of the name of Empress Jingū's mausoleum.

Biography
Harukata was born under the name  in the village of Takadahara, outside the walls of Kumamoto Castle.
In 1851, when Harukata was 15, Yūsuke became embroiled in a local scandal and was obliged to perform seppuku. Due to this, the Kaya family was in serious danger of collapse. In his capacity as the eldest son, Harukata assumed leadership of the family. Relying on relatives for support, Harukata and his siblings lived in extreme poverty.

In 1858, Kaya entered the nativist school of Hayashi Ōen and became intensely devoted to Shinto. Through Ōen, Harukata became acquainted with the priest Ōtaguro Tomoo. Kaya was known to break down in tears of passion when discussing the welfare of the nation. In his daily visits to Shinto shrines he was most scrupulous, evidently never missing a single day of worship, and prayed that foreign nations be brought to total submission before Japan.

In 1862, when the Imperial Court requested that the Kumamoto domain contribute forces to guard the Imperial Enclosure in Kyoto, the troops dispatched to the capital included active loyalists such as Kaya and Kawakami Gensai. In 1865, he was thrown into prison upon his return to Kumamoto for obscure reasons. He was released from prison in 1867, the year of the formal surrender of temporal power to the young Emperor Meiji by shogun Tokugawa Yoshinobu.

In 1868, Kaya was dispatched by the domainal authorities to Nagasaki in order to assess the situation there. There, he wrote a letter urging the Nagasaki magistrate not to open the port to foreign vessels and to repulse any attempts by foreigners to make landings. His letter was ignored, and he returned to Kumamoto in anguish.

A year later, in 1871, Kaya was implicated in the Two Lords Incident and imprisoned, but was soon released.

In order to placate the increasing discontent of the Keishintō, Kumamoto governor Yasuoka Ryōsuke appointed members to positions as shrine priests. Kaya became a priest at the Nishikiyama Shrine. In 1876, Kaya wrote and submitted a long memorial to the central government protesting the Haitorei edict in which he asserted that the bearing of arms by the general populace was not only an integral part of the Japanese way of life and national identity, but necessary for the operation of the militia as a component of national defense. While other followers of the late Ōen advocated for an immediate uprising against government forces in the area, he remained a voice of moderation and an advocate for lawful opposition. However, after an ukehi performed by Ōtaguro, Kaya agreed to participate in the Keishintō's rebellion.

The Keishintō conducted a night attack on Kumamoto Castle on October 24 of that year, and Kaya was killed during the fighting on the premises. His age at death was reckoned as 41 years old due to the Japanese custom of counting a person as one year old at the time of birth. His grave is located in the castle's adjoining .

References

1836 births
1876 deaths
Samurai
Japanese swordfighters
Kokugaku scholars
Japanese priests
Japanese Shintoists
Japanese nationalists
Japanese rebels